Woodsworth may refer to:

Ellen Woodsworth
J. S. Woodsworth
James Woodsworth
Judith Woodsworth
Woodsworth College, Toronto